The Long Farewell is a 1958 detective novel by the British writer Michael Innes. It is the fifteenth novel in his series featuring John Appleby, a senior detective with the Metropolitan Police. The title refers to a quote from Cardinal Wolsey in William Shakespeare's Henry VIII.

Synopsis
While holidaying in Verona Appleby drops in on an old acquaintance, the Shakespearean scholar Lewis Packard. Over dinner he wonders whether Packard has some new discovery that will again astound the world of literary scholarship. However, a few months later Packard is dead. After attending his burial in London, Appleby travels out to his Dorset mansion. The official police view is that Packard committed suicide with a revolver after being confronted with his two much younger wives who he had married bigamously. Apparenrlt overwhelmed by the situation he had shot himself. Appleby doubts this conclusion and his visit to the house reinforces this view.

References

Bibliography
 Hubin, Allen J. Crime Fiction, 1749-1980: A Comprehensive Bibliography. Garland Publishing, 1984.
 Reilly, John M. Twentieth Century Crime & Mystery Writers. Springer, 2015.
 Scheper, George L. Michael Innes. Ungar, 1986.

1958 British novels
British mystery novels
British crime novels
Novels by Michael Innes
Novels set in London
Novels set in Italy
Novels set in Dorset
British detective novels
Victor Gollancz Ltd books